Mohammed Qassim Jabbar (born 1957) is an Iraqi wrestler. He competed in the men's freestyle 48 kg at the 1980 Summer Olympics.

References

External links
 

1957 births
Living people
Iraqi male sport wrestlers
Olympic wrestlers of Iraq
Wrestlers at the 1980 Summer Olympics
Place of birth missing (living people)